Lily Dougall (1858–1923) was a Canadian author and feminist.

Biography
Born into an evangelical Presbyterian newspaper family, Dougall's liberal views often conflicted with her religious upbringing. She was the youngest of  the nine children. Although born in Montreal, Quebec, she was educated in New York City and at both the University of Edinburgh and St. Andrew's University in Scotland. While in Edinburgh, she lived with her aunt. She lived in Montreal from 1897 to 1903 until she finally settled down in Cumnor, near Oxford, in 1911. While there, she lived her life with her lesbian partner, Sophie Earp. In Cumnor, she became the center of a group that was dedicated to thought and conversation. This was similar in its views to that of her first essay, Pro Christo et Ecclesia (1900).

Her debut novel, Beggars All, was published in 1892 followed by nine other novels. Her contemporaries thought her novels were "well-received" and they have "been widely read far from the shores of her native land".  She also did write a novel prior to Beggars All, Lovereen, A Canadian Novel, that was published under a male pseudonym. She also published one volume of short stories and eight books of religious philosophy. Four of Dougall's novels have Canadian settings spanning from western British Columbia to Eastern Quebec to Atlantic Prince Edward Island. What Necessity Knows, The Zeitgeist, The Mermaid: A Love Tale and The Madonna of a Day: A Study. Her fiction is characterized by twists of fate, disguise, hidden identity and disillusioned love. More noteworthy, however, her work is known for its exploration of religious and philosophical themes. Many of her protagonists are strong, independent females who are typically drawn to the idea of egalitarian marriage.

Works 
 What Necessity Knows (1893)
 The Zeit-Geist (1895)
 The Mermaid (1895)
 A Dozen Ways Of Love  (1897)
 The Mormon Prophet (1899)
 The Summit House Mystery (1905)

References

Further reading

 Joanna Dean, Religious Experience and the New Woman: The Life of Lily Dougall (Bloomington: Indiana University Press, 2007).

External links

 
 
 
 
 
 Dougall at SFU Digitized Collections, Simon Fraser University, Coll. Canada's Early Women Writers (with a photograph)

1858 births
1923 deaths
19th-century American women writers
19th-century American writers
19th-century Canadian essayists
19th-century Canadian novelists
20th-century Canadian novelists
20th-century Canadian women writers
20th-century Canadian essayists
Canadian women essayists
Canadian women novelists
Writers from Montreal
19th-century Canadian women writers